Anatoliy Sedasov is a Soviet sprint canoer who competed in the early to mid-1970s. He won two medals in the K-1 4 x 500 m event at the ICF Canoe Sprint World Championships with a gold in 1970 and a bronze in 1971.

References

Living people
Soviet male canoeists
Year of birth missing (living people)
Russian male canoeists
ICF Canoe Sprint World Championships medalists in kayak